This is a list of notable people who were born or have lived in Penza, Russia.

Born in Penza

19th century

1801–1900 
 Aleksey Khovansky (1814–1899), publisher of the first Russian scientific linguistic journal Filologicheskie Zapiski
 Nikolay Ilminsky (1822–1891), Russian turkologist
 Pavel Maksutov (1825–1882), Imperial Russian Navy rear-admiral, prince, hero of Crimean War
 Ilya Salov (1834–1902), Russian writer, playwright and translator
 Peter Hermann Stillmark, scientist, founder of lectinology
 Vsevolod Meyerhold (1874–1940), Russian and Soviet theatre director, actor and theatrical producer
 Nikolai Avksentiev (1878–1943), leading member of the Russian Socialist-Revolutionary Party
 Peter Arshinov (1886–1939), acclaimed Russian Anarcho-Communist
 Ivan Mosjoukine (1889–1963), Russian silent film actor
 Vsevolod Pudovkin (1893–1953), Russian and Soviet film director, screenwriter and actor
 Aleksandr Medvedkin (1900–1989), Soviet Russian film director
 Vladimir Stavsky (1900–1943), Soviet Russian writer, editor and literary administrator

20th century

1901–1950 
 Konstantin Badygin (1910–1984), Soviet naval officer, explorer, author and scientist
 Anna Andreyeva (1915–1997), Soviet track and field athlete
 Pyotr Dolgov (1920–1962), colonel in the Soviet Air Force, Hero of the Soviet Union
 Victor Karpov (1928–1997), Russian diplomat
 Vladimir Grebennikov (1932–1992), Soviet ice hockey player
 Yuri Moiseev (1940–2005), Soviet ice hockey player
 Tatiana Dorofeeva (1948–2012), Russian linguist, orientalist and translator

1951–1970 
 Aleksandr Golikov (born 1952), Russian former ice hockey player
 Boris Sokolovsky (born 1953), Russian basketball coach and former player
 Vladimir Golikov (born 1954), Soviet ice hockey player
 Alexander Melentyev (1954–2015), Soviet competitive sport shooter who won the gold medal at the 1980 Summer Olympics
 Vasili Pervukhin (born 1956), Russian ice hockey player
 Alexander Kozhevnikov (born 1958), Soviet ice hockey player
 Aleksandr Geramisov (born 1959), Soviet ice hockey player
 Irina Kalinina (born 1959), Soviet diver and olympic champion
 Marat Kulakhmetov (born 1959), Major General of the Russian Army
 Sergei Svetlov (born 1961), Soviet ice hockey player
 Sergei Yashin (born 1962), Soviet ice hockey player
 Aleksey Vdovin (born 1963), Russian water polo player who competed in the 1992 Summer Olympics
 Aleksandr Samokutyayev (born 1970), Russian cosmonaut

1971–1980 
 Yan Kaminsky (born 1971), Soviet ice hockey player
 Vladislav Bulin (born 1972), Russian ice hockey defenceman
 Yuliya Pakhalina (born 1977), Russian diver; won the gold medal in the 2000 Summer Olympics
 Yuri Babenko (born 1978), Russian professional ice hockey player
 Vitaly Atyushov (born 1979), Russian ice hockey defenceman
 Yuri Dobryshkin (born 1979), Russian ice hockey player
 Alexei Kosourov (born 1979), Russian professional ice hockey player
 Igor Lukashin (born 1979), Russian diver; won the gold medal at the 2000 Summer Olympics
 Timur Rodriguez (born 1979), Russian showman, singer, TV and radio personality
 Pavel Volya (born 1979), Russian TV host, actor and singer
 Dimitri Altaryov (born 1980), Russian professional ice hockey winger
 Yevgeniya Bochkaryova (born 1980), Russian gymnast
 Natalya Sutyagina (born 1980), Russian butterfly swimmer

1981–1990 
 Andrei Kuzmin (born 1981), Russian ice hockey player
 Sergei Kuchmasov (born 1981), Belarusian springboard diver
 Viktor Burayev (born 1982), Russian race walker
 Dmitry Kokarev (born 1982), Russian chess player
 Alexei Medvedev (born 1982), Russian professional ice hockey forward
 Stanislav Zhmakin (born 1982), Russian ice hockey winger
 Yelena Dembo (born 1983), Greek chess player
 Sergei Ageyev (born 1984), Russian ice hockey goaltender
 Natalia Lavrova (1984–2010), Russian dual Olympic gold medalist
 Yevgeni Popov (born 1984), Russian cyclist
 Nadezhda Bazhina (born 1987), Russian diver
 Vladimir Galchenko (born 1987), Russian juggler
 Yekaterina Lisina (born 1987), Russian basketball player
 Oleg Vikulov (born 1987), Russian platform diver
 Roman Lyuduchin (born 1988), Russian professional ice hockey forward
 Sergei Andronov (born 1989), Russian professional ice hockey player
 Pavel Medvedev (born 1989), Russian professional ice hockey player
 Olga Galchenko (born 1990), Russian juggler

1991–2000 
 Denis Ablyazin (born 1992), Russian artistic gymnast
 Egor Kreed (born 1994), Russian rapper and singer-songwriter
 Anton Slepyshev (born 1994), Russian professional ice hockey player
 Aleksandr Kalyashin (born 1995), Russian football defender
 Ziyat Paigin (born 1995), Russian professional ice hockey defenceman
 Maria Astashkina (born 1999), Russian swimmer
 Klim Kostin (born 1999),, ice hockey player

Lived in Penza 
 Alexandr Aksakov (1832–1903), Russian writer, translator, journalist, editor, state official and psychic researcher
 Nikolai Ishutin (1840–1879), Russian utopian socialist; was raised in Penza
 Aristarkh Lentulov (1882–1943), Russian avant-garde artist of Cubist orientation; studied art in the Penza art school
 Alexandr and Mariya Dmitriev, the couple who owns a pet cougar named Messi

See also 

 List of Russian people
 List of Russian-language poets

External links 
 Известные люди в городе Пенза 
 Знаменитые люди Пензы 
 Пензенские спортсмены 

Penza